Ainsley canal is a short canal located in Chennai. The canal starts near Villivakkam railway station and connects Otteri Nullah with railway quarters and Integral Coach Factory near Ayanavaram.

It has become highly polluted, with the residents of Pilkington Road, Vasantha Garden, Appathurai Main Road, Palayakaran Street and Madurai Street dumping wastes. The plight of the canal has not improved though the railways has desilted the canal in year 2006.

References 

Geography of Chennai
Canals in Tamil Nadu